is the thirty-sixth single of J-pop girl group Morning Musume. It was released under the Zetima label on April 16, 2008. The Single V DVD of the single was released on April 23, 2008.

Overview
There are three editions. Limited edition A comes along with a bonus DVD, while limited edition B comes with another DVD. The catalog numbers of each limited edition copies are EPCE-5540 and EPCE-5542, respectively. The regular edition has a catalog number EPCE-5544.

With the original, Another ver., a Studio Dance Shot version, a Night Scene version, and a One-cut Dance version, it makes the most PVs ever released for one single. Also notable is the smoky eye make-up used on the members, a daring new look for Morning Musume as they attempt to expand into Asia.

Track listing 
All lyrics are written by Tsunku.

CD 
 
 
 "Resonant Blue (Instrumental)"

Limited A DVD 
 "Resonant Blue (Another Ver.)"

Limited B DVD 
 "Resonant Blue (Lesson Studio Ver.)"

Single V 
 "Resonant Blue"
 "Resonant Blue (Night Scene Ver.)"

Event V 
 "Resonant Blue (One Cut Dance Ver.)"
 "Resonant Blue TV - SPOT (15sec./30sec.)"
 "Resonant Blue TV - SPOT (Solo Ver.)"

Members at the time of single 
 5th generation: Ai Takahashi, Risa Niigaki
 6th generation: Eri Kamei, Sayumi Michishige, Reina Tanaka
 7th generation: Koharu Kusumi
 8th generation: Aika Mitsui, Junjun, Linlin

Personnel 
 Ai Takahashi – main vocals
 Risa Niigaki – minor vocals
 Eri Kamei – minor vocals
 Sayumi Michishige – minor vocals
 Reina Tanaka – main vocals
 Koharu Kusumi – center vocals
 Aika Mitsui – minor vocals
 Junjun – minor vocals
 Linlin – minor vocals

Oricon ranks and sales 

Total (CD single) sales: 55,531 (as of May 16, 2008)
Total (DVD single) sales: —

References

External links 
 Resonant Blue entry on the Up-Front Works official website

Morning Musume songs
Zetima Records singles
2008 singles
Songs written by Tsunku
Song recordings produced by Tsunku
Japanese-language songs
2008 songs
Dance-pop songs
Japanese synth-pop songs